Imasgho is a department or commune of Boulkiemdé Province in central Burkina Faso. As of 2005, it had a population of 24,106. Its capital lies at the town of Imasgho.

Towns and villages
ImasghoDaniermaKanyaléLoungaOuéraRana

References

Departments of Burkina Faso
Boulkiemdé Province